Rony Fahed (born November 6, 1981 in Achrafieh, Lebanon) is a Lebanese professional basketball player currently a free agent in the Lebanese Basketball League. He was also a member of the Lebanon national basketball team that participated in the 2002 FIBA World Championship in Indianapolis in the United States, in the 2006 FIBA World Championship which took place in Japan, and in the 2010 FIBA World Championship held in Turkey. Fahed also participated at the 2007 FIBA Asia Championship, 2009 FIBA Asia Championship and other international tournaments.

Career

Statistics
1997-1998: Kahraba Zouk: 2.63spg, 4.38apg
1998-1999: Kahraba Zouk: 1.9spg, 3apg
1999-: Kahraba Zouk: 3.7apg
2000-2001: CAE Jamhour(1T): Assists-3 (5.7), 1.82spg, 3.47rbg, 82% FT, 36% 3pt
2001-2002: Jamhour (1T): 10.2ppg, 1.65spg, 5.24apg
2002-2003: Blue Stars (Lebanon) (1T): 16.39ppg, 3.61rpg, 2.17spg, 3.39apg, 37% 3pt
2003-2004: Blue Stars (Lebanon) (1T): 15.1ppg, 2.4rpg, Assists-1 (5.8), Steals-3 (2.1), 3pt-1 (45%)

Awards and achievements

William Jones Cup -07
Asian Clubs Championship -07
Lebanon Senior National Team -99 to present
Asian Championships in Doha -05 (Silver): 12.75ppg (23 3-pters made in 7 games), 2.13apg, 1.75spg
WABA cup 2005
WABA Cup -04
Asia-Basket.com Lebanese League All-Domestic Players Team -04, 05
Asian Championships -99(6th), 01(Finalist), 03(4th), 05(Finalist), 07(Finalist)
Asia-Basket.com All-Lebanese League 2nd Team -04
Asia-Basket Lebanese League All-Domestic Players Team -04
West Asian Cup -04
West Asian Championships in Tehran -04
FIBA World Championships -02,06,10
Mediterranean Games in Tunisia -01
West Asian Championship 1st place -00, 01: 17.53mpg, 83%FT, 45% 3PT, 11PPG, 2.75RPG, 1.25SPG, 3APG
Lebanese Championship Under18 1st place-99 (kahraba)
Lebanon National Team -99-01-02-03-05-06-07-08-09
Captain, Lebanese U22 National Team -98 (team that beat China with Yao Ming)
Lebanese Championship Under 18 1st place-98 (kahraba)

References

1981 births
Living people
Lebanese men's basketball players
Point guards
Tianjin Pioneers players
Basketball players at the 2006 Asian Games
2010 FIBA World Championship players
2006 FIBA World Championship players
2002 FIBA World Championship players
Asian Games competitors for Lebanon
Sagesse SC basketball players